Hemijana is a genus of moths in the family Eupterotidae.

Species
 Hemijana griseola Rothschild, 1917
 Hemijana subrosea Aurivillius, 1893
 Hemijana variegata Rothschild, 1917

Former species
 Hemijana ruberrima Rothschild, 1917

References

Janinae
Moth genera